The 2002–03 Euro Hockey Tour was the seventh season of the Euro Hockey Tour. The season consisted of four tournaments, the Česká Pojišťovna Cup, Karjala Tournament, Baltica Brewery Cup, and the Sweden Hockey Games.

Tournaments

Česká Pojišťovna Cup
Russia won the Česká Pojišťovna Cup.

Karjala Tournament
Finland won the Karjala Tournament.

Baltica Brewery Cup
The Czech Republic won the Baltica Brewery Cup. Slovakia also participated in the tournament. The games they participated in did not count towards the final standings of the Euro Hockey Tour.

Sweden Hockey Games
Russia won the Sweden Hockey Games. Canada also participated in the tournament. The games they participated in did not count towards the final standings of the Euro Hockey Tour.

Final standings

References
Euro Hockey Tour website

Euro Hockey Tour
2002–03 in European ice hockey
2002–03 in Canadian ice hockey
2002–03 in Russian ice hockey
2002–03 in Czech ice hockey
2002–03 in Swedish ice hockey
2002–03 in Finnish ice hockey